The 1963–64 Michigan Wolverines men's basketball team represented the University of Michigan in intercollegiate college basketball during the 1963–64 season. The team played its home games at Fielding H. Yost Field House on the school's campus in Ann Arbor, Michigan. This was the first of three consecutive Big Ten titles and Michigan's first visit to the NCAA Division I men's basketball tournament Final Four. According to the Michigan's Basketball media guide, during the season junior Bill Buntin led the Big Ten conference in rebounding, although the Big Ten records, which count only conference games, do not recognize this fact. The team earned the Big Ten team statistical championships for both scoring defense (75.5) and scoring margin (10.3). Sophomore Cazzie Russell led the team in scoring with 24.8, while Buntin added 23.2 points per game. The team spent the entire 15-week season ranked in the Associated Press Top Ten Poll, ending the season ranked number two after starting the season ranked number eight. The team also finished the season ranked number two in the final UPI Coaches' Poll. Bob Cantrell served as team captain, while Russell earned team MVP. Buntin earned All-American recognition. During the season, Russell established the school single-season point total record with 670. Russell made 150 of 178 free throws to establish the school single-season free throw percentage record of 84.27, which stood for 32 years and continues to be the highest percentage by a Wolverine sophomore. Buntin made 151 free throws which was a school record that Russell eclipsed the following season.

In the 25-team 1964 NCAA Division I men's basketball tournament, Michigan had an opening round bye before defeating the Loyola Ramblers 84–80 and the Ohio Bobcats 69–57 to win the Mideast region. In the final four, the team lost to a Jeff Mullins-led Duke Blue Devils team 91–80 before defeating Kansas State 100–90 in the consolation game.  In the tournament Buntin set an NCAA tournament final four single-game record by making 15 free throws on March 21 against the Wildcats.  The record was broken the following season on March 20, 1965.  Although the team lost in the national semi-finals, it would return its two key stars and reach the finals of the 1965 NCAA Division I men's basketball tournament the following season.

Rankings

Notes
  In the Los Angeles Basketball Classic, UCLA defeated then third-ranked Michigan, 98-80 in front of 14,241 in the Los Angeles Sports Arena.

Team players drafted into the NBA
Four players from this team were selected in the NBA Draft.

References

See also
 List of NCAA men's Division I Final Four appearances by coach
 List of the NCAA Division I men's basketball tournament Final Four participants
 NCAA Men's Division I Final Four appearances by school
 NCAA Men's Division I Tournament bids by school
 NCAA Men's Division I Tournament bids by school and conference
 NCAA Division I men's basketball tournament all-time team records

External links
Pre-NCAA tournament publicity video

Michigan
Michigan Wolverines men's basketball seasons
NCAA Division I men's basketball tournament Final Four seasons
Michigan
Michigan Wolverines basketball
Michigan Wolverines basketball